All of Us is a 2019 Belgian drama film directed by Willem Wallyn.
Maaike Neuville won the best actrice award for her performance as Cathy at the 2021 Oostend film festival.

Cast 
 Maaike Neuville as Cathy
 Barbara Sarafian as Els
 Joke Devynck as Elisabeth
 Wim Opbrouck as Cédric
  as Philippe

References

External links 

2019 drama films
2019 films
Belgian drama films
2010s Dutch-language films